Pelco Incorporated is a U.S.-based security and surveillance technologies company, founded in 1957 and headquartered in Fresno, California. Pelco is a provider of security cameras, recording and management systems, software, and services. Pelco products can be found in outdoor environments, cities, hospitals, airports, seaports, gaming facilities, retail, and office environments, schools, and universities.

History
Pelco Sales was founded in 1957 in Hawthorne, California by E.L. Heinrich. Heinrich created Pelco Sales as a side project to his already successful mechanical aviation business. Pelco Sales' first product line consisted of pan-tilt devices and joysticks designed to remotely control the position of television cameras. The demand for Pelco Sales' products grew rapidly, resulting in Heinrich's decision to abandon aviation and focus on camera technologies.

The company was moved to Gardena, California, and later to Fresno, California, to provide adequate workspace for product production. In June 1987, Rod Heinrich sold Pelco Sales to local investor David McDonald shortly after approving plans for an 80,000 square foot facility in Clovis, California. McDonald truncated the name to Pelco, in an event commonly referred to as the beginning of the "new" Pelco. The company continued to expand, reaching distribution in more than 130 countries. In 2000 the Small Business Administration awarded the company its Small Business of the Year award.

After the events of 9/11 the company financed the construction of the California 9/11 Memorial at their corporate headquarters. The memorial opened on December 8, 2001 less than three months after the attacks and includes objects recovered from ground zero, educational exhibits, and memorials with the names of the victims. In 2019 the memorial expanded with replicas of the pentagon and world trade centers.

In 2007, French electrical equipment manufacturer Schneider Electric purchased Pelco for US$1.22 billion in an effort to enhance their building automation business. Schneider Electric's ownership of Pelco came to an end when Pelco was acquired by Transom Capital Group, a private equity firm based in Los Angeles, in 2019. In August 2020, Motorola Solutions announced that they had acquired Pelco for US$110 million in cash.

Pelco's security and surveillance systems most notably protect Buckingham Palace, Sydney Opera House and The Statue of Liberty. Pelco claims more than 1 million installations worldwide.

Technologies
Pelco produces security and surveillance products and is known for its pan tilt zoom (PTZ) technologies, multiple camera tracking of moving objects, and tracking of security breaches. Additionally the company has over 250 patents assigned to the company.

Industries 

 Commercial
 Retail
 Industry and Technology
 Government and Military
 Correctional facilities 
 City and Traffic
 Healthcare
 Gaming
 Airports and Seaports 
 Education

References

Companies based in Fresno County, California
Electronics companies established in 1957
Clovis, California
Manufacturing companies based in California
Video surveillance companies
1957 establishments in California